The Cave is a 2005 American action horror film, directed by Bruce Hunt and distributed by Screen Gems. It was written by Michael Steinberg and Tegan West. Its story follows a group of cave-divers and scientists who become trapped while exploring a cave system in Romania, and encounter a pack of deadly creatures. It stars Cole Hauser, Eddie Cibrian, Morris Chestnut, Marcel Iureș, Lena Headey, Rick Ravanello, Piper Perabo and Daniel Dae Kim.

The film was produced by Lakeshore Entertainment and Cinerenta and was released on August 26, 2005. It grossed $6.1 million during its opening weekend and $33.3 million worldwide, against a budget of $30 million. It received negative reviews and has a 12% approval rating based on 111 reviews on Rotten Tomatoes.

Plot
During the Cold War era, a group of Soviet and British plunderers drive to an abandoned 13th-century abbey in the Carpathian Mountains.

Within the derelict abbey are many mosaics depicting mythological creatures and winged demons. The men wish to access the vaults beneath the floor, and set up a dynamite charge, but the entire floor splits beneath them and they fall through to the bottom of a vast cave system. The explosion also triggers a landslide which demolishes the abbey and covers the opening above the men. They descend further into the cave in the hope of finding a way out, and hear strange rattling sounds in the darkness.

Some time later in 2005, a team led by Dr Nicolai, with his associate Dr Kathryn Jennings and cameraman Alex Kim, are excavating the site of the former abbey. They find an opening and examine some of the curious mosaics which are still intact inside the ruins. After further research, Dr Nicolai discovers a river that stretches for miles inside the cave system. Local biologists believe the cave could contain an undiscovered ecosystem, so Dr Nicolai hires a group of American divers led by brothers Jack and Tyler McAllister – thrill seeking professional cave explorers who run a world famous scuba diving team.

The divers arrive in Romania with a modified rebreather which allows a diver to remain submerged for up to 24 hours. The team includes rock-climbing professional Charlie, first scout Briggs, sonar expert Strode, and survival expert Top Buchanan.

The group descend on cables to the base camp they have set up below. Briggs is chosen to go into the river first to scout ahead. After following the river for two miles he sees something in the distance, but before he can provide more details the server crashes and he loses contact. 

Jack and the rest of the group press on, thinking the problem is simply an equipment malfunction. They eventually find Briggs safe downriver. But Strode is suddenly attacked and dragged away by a large, strange creature. As Strode fights for his life, he grabs on to his water scooter and turns it on full speed, but the creature latches on to Strode and pulls him back into a dark crevice. The water scooter speeds off on its own and crashes into the cave wall causing a rock fall.

The group start to look for Strode but Jack calls them back. He realizes the cave-in has now forced them to follow the river and search for a new way out. Dr Nicolai believes they should wait to be rescued, but Jack reminds Nicolai that they are three miles below the surface entrance and their support crew is not scheduled to retrieve them for 12 days. 

Jack and Top decide to follow the river together along the line left by Strode. Jack is seized by one of the creatures that attacked Strode, but is able to fight it off. When the men make it back to the team, Jack has three deep cuts on his back, as well as a huge claw he severed from the creature. 

Kathryn looks at cells from the claw under a microscope and notices a mutation within them. She realizes the mutations indicate the presence of a parasite. Nicolai discovers the same parasite in all of the lifeforms they find. The known cave species all originated above ground, she explains, but have adapted over generations to life underground. Kathryn theorizes this new parasite originated in the cave environment and has never been exposed to the outside world.

The team stumble across the equipment and remains of previous explorers and also find a femur bone with large teeth marks, unaware they are themselves being stalked by the creatures. The team is obliged to descend through a series of rapids. Tyler sees Nicolai hanging on to the side of the cave, his leg badly injured, but is sucked down into the current, before he can help. As everyone starts to surface, they hear Nicolai screaming. Jack volunteers to retrieve him and swims over, but as he approaches, Nicolai is dragged underwater by one of the creatures. Jack lights a flare and swims deep below the surface, where he can see the creature pulling Nicolai to his death. However, Jack clearly sees tattooed letters on the creature's hands, proving the mutants were once human.

Jack regroups with the team on shore. But his senses and physical features are beginning to transform as a result of the scratches he got earlier. His hearing has improved significantly and his other senses are heightened. When Jack tells them they must go back up the cave wall to escape, Charlie scales the wall but is soon attacked by a creature hidden in the passage above. The human-sized winged mutation kills her on the cliff face in full view of the team. 

As Jack exhibits super-keen senses and inhumanly slanted pupils, Kathryn theorises that what is happening to Jack has happened before. She speculates that Jack, the previous explorers and all the ecosystem's creatures mutated due to the parasite; the infected humans now resemble the winged demons depicted in the mosaics. Witnessing Jack's transformation, some of the survivors question his judgement and the team splits up. Alex, Briggs and Kathryn go their own way, while Top and Tyler stay with Jack.

Jack, Top and Tyler discover a cavern littered with human skeletons and realize this is the ancient battleground depicted in the mosaics; the abbey's residents battled these creatures centuries ago and sealed the cave to prevent them from escaping. Jack notices there is light and cold water coming through the center of the river, which confirms this is the passageway out of the cave. He lets Tyler go back to find the others, but in doing so he witnesses Briggs's death - impaled on spikes on the cave wall.

Tyler saves Kathryn and brings her to the passageway. On their way back, they meet Alex and all run to rejoin Jack and Top. However, the creatures have entered the cavern and stolen the rebreathers necessary to navigate the passage. Top, Kathryn, Tyler and Alex run into the river toward the passageway, but Alex is killed before he can get in the water, a creature grabbing him from above. Jack causes a distraction, allowing the others to escape while he sacrifices himself by battling the creatures. The three resurface in a huge canyon and are finally safe.

The survivors return to civilization and Top departs. A little while later, Tyler and Kathryn meet up and he asks her if Jack could have survived out in the open in his mutated state. Kathryn says she had originally thought the parasite could only survive underground, but now she is uncertain; she suspects the parasite wants to get out. When she lowers her sunglasses, it is clear that Kathryn's eyes have mutated just like Jack's. Kathryn then quickly walks away, as Tyler realizes she knows she is infected with the parasite, and that she intends to remain free, able to infect others. He runs after her, but she disappears in the crowd.

Cast
 Cole Hauser as Jack McAllister, one of two thrill-seeking professional cave explorers, along with his brother Tyler
 Eddie Cibrian as Tyler McAllister, Jack's fellow thrill-seeking professional cave explorer and brother
 Morris Chestnut as Top Buchanan, a survival expert
 Lena Headey as Kathryn Jennings, a scientist
 Piper Perabo as Charlie, a rock-climbing professional
 Rick Ravanello as Briggs, a member of the dive team
 Daniel Dae Kim as Alex Kim, a cameraman
 Kieran Darcy-Smith as Strode, a sonar expert
 Marcel Iureș as Dr. Nicolai, a scientist and leader of the expedition
 Vlad Rădescu as Dr. Bacovia

Brian Steele portrays the creatures in the cave.

Reception
The Cave received mostly negative reviews. The review aggregator website Rotten Tomatoes reported that 12% of critics have given the film a positive review based on 111 reviews, with an average rating of 3.5/10. The critics consensus reads, "Despite its stylized and impressive sets, this horror-monster movie mish-mash suffers from endless cliches and wildly implausible plotlines." On Metacritic, the film has a weighted average score of 30 out of 100 based on 24 critics, indicating "generally unfavorable reviews". Audiences polled by CinemaScore gave the film an average grade "C−" on an A+ to F scale.

The main complaint was the lack of character building and overly familiar cliches, with Neil Smith of BBC Online calling it "a generic duffer that is as exciting as a hole in the ground". Robert Koehler made the same observation in Variety, writing, "The Cave feels familiar as it goes through the rote edicts of the scientific crew vs. beastie formula". In her review for the New York Times, Laura Kern praised the film’s sets and visual style, but denounced the script, writing "Having worked as second- and third-unit director on the Matrix trilogy and Dark City, Bruce Hunt is no stranger to inspired and stylish productions. But whereas those films managed to inject new life into tired territory, The Cave, his first effort as director, fails to generate anything resembling innovation." Judy Chia Hui Hsu wrote in The Seattle Times, "the serenity of the largely aquatic underground world framed by majestic stalagmites and serpentine corridors succeeds in capturing the moviegoer’s attention," but added, "The insipid dialog lacks even a hint of comic relief, so the audience is grateful when the action quickly kicks into gear," and "one of the film’s biggest letdowns is that the vicious beast, seen in the full light of the final scenes, is not such a surprise after all. The creature is simply an amalgamation of monsters we’ve seen before".

Box office
In the US, the film opened ranked #5 grossing $6,147,294 at 2,195 sites, averaging $2,800. It went on to have a final US gross of $15,007,991. In Australia, it opened at 89 sites, averaging A$3,204 grossing A$285,121. It had a second-weekend decrease by 74%, and had a finishing gross of A$570,131. Worldwide, the film has grossed $33,296,457.

Soundtrack

Two soundtrack CDs were released on August 26, 2005 by Lakeshore Records, one with the score by the film's composers Reinhold Heil and Johnny Klimek and the other one which features tracks by heavy metal bands including Atreyu, Lacuna Coil, Diecast, Burning Brides, Ill Niño, Killswitch Engage, Shadows Fall, It Dies Today, Trivium and more. Also, the single Nemo by Nightwish is featured during the end credits of the film.

See also
 The Descent, a 2005 British film with the same premise
 The Cavern, a third similar film released in 2005

References

External links
 
 
 
 
 

2005 films
American science fiction action films
2005 horror films
2000s science fiction horror films
Lakeshore Entertainment films
2000s monster movies
Films set in Romania
Films shot in Bucharest
Films shot in Mexico
Films shot in Romania
Screen Gems films
Adventure horror films
American body horror films
American action horror films
American science fiction horror films
American survival films
Films produced by Tom Rosenberg
Films produced by Gary Lucchesi
Films scored by Reinhold Heil
Films scored by Johnny Klimek
American monster movies
2000s action horror films
2005 directorial debut films
2000s English-language films
2000s American films